Sandra Barneda Valls (born 4 October 1975) is a Spanish journalist, television presenter, actress, and writer.

Biography
Sandra Barneda was born in Barcelona on 4 October 1975. She holds a licentiate in journalism from the Autonomous University of Barcelona's Faculty of Information Sciences, and is also a graduate of the Barcelona School of Theater.

She has worked at Catalunya Ràdio, RNE4, Antena 3, Telemadrid, 8TV, TV3, La 2, and Telecinco, as well as writing for El Periódico de Catalunya, Elle and Zero.

On 4 May 2009 she premiered  on Telecinco, a controversial program which used actors to recreate court cases without advising viewers that they were dramatizations.

On 1 May 2010, Barneda took on the role of presenting issues to be discussed on La Noria, succeeding .

On 10 April 2013, she published her first novel, Reír al viento. On 21 December of the same year she released her second book, Cómo construir una superheroína.

In the summers of 2013, 2014, and 2015, she hosted  with Joaquín Prat, replacing Ana Rosa Quintana.

From April 2014 to August 2016, she presented the Telecinco evening program  with Alyson Eckmann, Natalia Millán, Beatriz Montañez, Yolanda Ramos, Rocío Carrasco, Marta Torné, Alba Carrillo, Mónica Martínez, and Soledad León de Salazar.

From October 2014 to June 2015, she presented a new Telecinco debate show on Saturday nights, titled .

On 15 October 2014 her novel La tierra de las mujeres was published.

From September 2015 until March 2016, she presented the sobremesa program  on 8TV.

In January 2016 she began presenting the Telecinco reality show Gran Hermano VIP on Sunday nights.

From 2016 to 2018, she led debate segments on Survivor Spain, replacing Raquel Sánchez-Silva.

Personal life
In December 2014, Sandra Barneda came out as being in a relationship with another woman, in response to a question from actor  on Hable con ellas. In a 2016 interview, she spoke about previously having lived with presenter Tània Sàrrias, though denied rumors that they had been married. On Lesbian Visibility Day in April 2019, she and partner Nagore Robles (who had been a contestant on Gran Hermano VIP) posted pictures of themselves kissing and publicly affirmed their support for LGBT rights.

TV programs
 Canal Teledeporte (1997–1998), TVE
 L'Informatiu Cap de Setmana (1998–1999), TVE
 Noticias Fin de Semana (1999–2000), Antena 3
  daily summaries (2000), Antena 3
  (2004), Telemadrid
  (2004–2006), Telemadrid
 Envasat al 8 (2007), 8TV
 Vacances Pagades (2008), TV3
 Fábrica de ideas (2008), La 2
  presenter (2009–2014), Telecinco
 La Noria (2010–2012), Telecinco
 Secretos y mentiras presenter (2012), Telecinco
  (2012–2013), Telecinco
  (2013–2015), Telecinco
  (2014–2016), Telecinco
  (2014–2015), Telecinco
  (2015–2016), 8TV
 Survivor: El Debate (2016–2018), Telecinco
 Gran Hermano VIP: El Debate (2016–present), Telecinco
 El otoño fantastico de Telecinco (2017), Telecinco
 Gran Hermano Revolution: Última Hora (2017), Telecinco
  (2019), Cuatro
  (2019), Telecinco (Temporal Hosting)
  (2021-present), Telecinco

TV series
 Al salir de clase (2000) as Begoña, Telecinco
 Compañeros (2001), Antena 3
  (2002–2003) as psychologist, Telecinco

Books
 Reír al viento (2013), 
 La tierra de las mujeres (2014), 
 Cómo construir una superheroína (2014), 
 Hablarán de nosotras (2016), 
 Las hijas del agua (2018),

References

External links

 
 

1975 births
21st-century Spanish women writers
Actresses from Barcelona
Autonomous University of Barcelona alumni
Spanish LGBT broadcasters
Spanish LGBT journalists
Living people
Spanish television journalists
Spanish women journalists
Spanish television presenters
Spanish women television presenters
Spanish radio presenters
Spanish women radio presenters
Writers from Barcelona